Salur or Saluru is a municipal town and mandal headquarters in Parvathipuram Manyam district, of the Indian state of Andhra Pradesh.

Geography
It has an average elevation of 118 metres (387 ft). It is bounded by Makkuva, Bobbili, Ramabhadrapuram and Pachipenta mandals of Andhra Pradesh state. Salur is surrounded with green forests and chains of hills on two sides and by River Vegavathi on the other two.

The climate of the town is generally characterized by high humidity almost all round the year, oppressive summer, and seasonal rainfall. The temperature varies between 17 and 40 degrees of Celsius. Average annual rainfall is 1074.0 mm. The nature of the soil is generally black cotton soil.

Demographics
The total population constitutes   males,  females and  children (age 0–6 years). The average literacy rate stands at 73.22% with  literates, approximately equal to the national average of 73.00%.

Administration

Municipality 
Salur was a major panchayat till 1950. It was established in 1950 and was upgraded as grade II municipality in 2001.

The source of water supply is River Vegavathi, with 200 public taps and 226 public bore–wells. The municipality supplies  litres per day of total drinking water is supplied with a per capita of 80 litres per day. The municipality has  of roads, 4 public parks, 5 playgrounds, 11 community halls etc. There are 23 elementary and 2 secondary schools for education purpose.

Legislative Assembly 

Andhra Pradesh Legislative Assembly Constituency of Salur is reserved for Scheduled Tribes.

Education
The primary and secondary school education is imparted by government, aided and private schools, under the state School Education Department. The medium of instruction followed by schools are English and Telugu.

See also 
List of municipalities in Andhra Pradesh

References

External links

Towns in Vizianagaram district
Mandal headquarters in Vizianagaram district